KKJO-FM is a radio station in St. Joseph, Missouri, broadcasting at 105.5 on the FM dial. The station airs a Top 40 format with the brand name K-Jo 105-5.

The transmitter is located across the border south of Troy, Kansas.

History of KKJO-AM
A radio station in St. Joseph, Missouri with the call letters KRES originally debuted on June 7, 1946, at 1230 AM and 250 watts.  The KRES call letters were derived from last names of the four original station owners: local attorney/financier Basil Kaufmann, sportscaster Paul Roscoe, liquor distributor Joseph Epsten and pharmacist Al Shanin. Roscoe was the first station manager. The original studios were located on the 2nd floor of the Commerce Loan Company, also owned by Kaufmann, at 7th and Edmond Streets in downtown St. Joseph, with the original transmitter located near the south end of the Belt Highway near Pear Street.  Dward A. Moore was the station's first program director. One of the first regularly scheduled programs on the station was a daily performance by Minor Clites, a blind piano player who lived in Saint Joseph. In November 1951, the FCC licensed the station move to 1550 kHz AM with increased power of 5,000 watts.  The KKJO call letters were adopted in 1961, and KRES today is used by a country station in Moberly, Missouri. The owner at the time was George Marti a Cleburne, Texas broadcasting equipment manufacturer. While the KKJO call sign was a convenient reference to "St. Joe", in an interview published in Broadcasting magazine, Marti revealed that the actual choice of the call letters was an acknowledgement to his wife, Jo.   The middle of the road format was dropped in 1965 for Top 40. Calling themselves Tiger Radio, KKJO was St. Joseph's version of Top-40 radio akin to the pioneering sound at nearby WHB in Kansas City. As the 1970s passed, KKJO became more oriented to oldies, and into the 80s it had acquired more sports and talk oriented programming.

1960-1989: KUSN-FM
The FM counterpart to KKJO, originally at 105.1 MHz, debuted in 1960. KUSN-FM simulcast with Top 40 KUSN at 1270 kHz. In the wake of KKJO's success, KUSN AM-FM switched to an easy listening format in 1966 and later to a modern country format in 1967.  KUSN-FM's call letters were changed to KSFT (K-Soft) in 1974 to reflect a new automated Schulke beautiful music format which was adopted at the time. The FM power was increased from 3 kW ERP to 27.5 kW ERP and stereo was first broadcast.  In 1977, KSFT (T-105) adopted an automated Top 40 format, moved to Album Rock in 1978, and, when it was acquired from KUSN in 1979, was switched to a successful country format.

1989-2000: KKJO "K-Jo 105" 
KKJO swapped frequencies with KSFT on March 1, 1989, moving the country format to the AM, and KKJO (K-JO 105) shifted to Top 40/CHR. In 1992, in the wake of the growing presence of rhythmic tracks on Top-40, KKJO became Hot Adult Contemporary while KSFT started broadcasting satellite formats, first adult standards and later oldies.

2000-Present KKJO "K-Jo 105-5" 
On April 24, 2000, at 6 a.m., KKJO moved to 105.5 FM, as Susquehanna (now Cumulus Media) prepared to introduce an '80s music format, KFME, in the Kansas City market. KKJO's last song played on 105.1 was also the first song they played in 1989, "We Built This City" by Starship. The first song after the move to 105.5 was "Everything You Want" by Vertical Horizon. Today, the station has evolved back to a Top 40 (CHR) format. In some years before sister station KESJ switched to a music format, KKJO would play all-Christmas music in the final weeks of the year.

On May 21, 2011, KKJO played "It's The End of the World As We Know It (And I Feel Fine)" by R.E.M. on loop for hours as a stunt related to the end times prediction by Harold Camping.

K-JO in the ratings
St. Joseph, while a separate television market from Kansas City, is part of Kansas City's area of dominant influence in Arbitron ratings. As such, KKJO rarely shows up in Kansas City's ratings. However, as both Kansas City and St. Joseph stations can broadcast as far as Topeka, Kansas, KKJO has registered marginal ratings in Topeka's semi-annual surveys.

KKJO is currently programmed by Gregg Lynn.

Air staff

Mornings: 
 Rick Reynolds (1989)
 Doug Devereaux  (1990)
 Rick and Bj (1991–2002)
 The Gregg and BJ Show (2003–2014)
 Gregg Lynn (2014–2020)
 Matt and Kate (2020-Now)

Middays: 
 Bj Scott (1988-1991)
 Michael Roads (Sign on - 2002)
 Sandy Tyler (Sign on - 2002)
 Cyndee Cambell (2002–Present)

Late Afternoons: 
 Rick Reynonlds (Sign on - 2011)
 Matt Stooks (2011–?)
 Samester

Nights: 
 Lance Ingram (Sign on - 2003)
 Jeremy Night (2003 - July 2004)
 Kasey Huston (August 2004 - September 2005)
 Becca Reid (October 3, 2005 - April 2008)
 David Fudge (April 2008 – 2012)
 Jason Young (2012–?t)
 Karina (?-?)

Overnights: 
 Allan Mansfield (Sign-on - 2001) 
 Dan Michaels (2005–2011)
 Danielle Norwood (2011–Present)

Weekend/Swing: 
 Jockless (Sign-on - Present)

References

External links
eaglecom.net
K-Jo 105.5 website

KJO-FM
St. Joseph, Missouri
Radio stations in Missouri
Contemporary hit radio stations in the United States